The 2002–03 Cypriot Third Division was the 32nd season of the Cypriot third-level football league. PAEEK FC won their 2nd title.

Format
Fourteen teams participated in the 2002–03 Cypriot Third Division. All teams played against each other twice, once at their home and once away. The team with the most points at the end of the season crowned champions. The first three teams were promoted to the 2003–04 Cypriot Second Division and the last three teams were relegated to the 2003–04 Cypriot Fourth Division.

Point system
Teams received three points for a win, one point for a draw and zero points for a loss.

Changes from previous season
Teams promoted to 2002–03 Cypriot Second Division
 SEK Agiou Athanasiou
 Ayia Napa
 AEK/Achilleas Ayiou Theraponta

Teams relegated from 2001–02 Cypriot Second Division
 Omonia Aradippou
 AEZ Zakakiou
 Adonis Idaliou

Teams promoted from 2001–02 Cypriot Fourth Division
 AEM Mesogis
 Elpida Xylofagou
 Achyronas Liopetriou

Teams relegated to 2002–03 Cypriot Fourth Division
 PEFO Olympiakos
 Rotsidis Mammari
 ATE PEK Ergaton

League standings

Results

See also
 Cypriot Third Division
 2002–03 Cypriot First Division
 2002–03 Cypriot Cup

Sources

Cypriot Third Division seasons
Cyprus
2002–03 in Cypriot football